Eric Winston Ludy (born December 17, 1970) is an author, speaker and president of Ellerslie Mission Society. He is also the senior pastor at the Church at Ellerslie and the lead instructor at Ellerslie Leadership Training in Windsor, Colorado. Ludy is the author of more than a dozen books, many of which were co-authored with his wife, Leslie Ludy.

Biography 

Eric Ludy's spouse is author Leslie Ludy. The two were married in December 1994 in Denver, Colorado. Their love story garnered much attention from the Christian community and was detailed in their book When Dreams Come True.

Eric Ludy's first book was published when he was 24 years old. From that point forward Ludy began traveling around the world, speaking on the principles of the Christian life. Over a three-year period from 2005 to 2008, Ludy, along with his wife, Leslie, wrote 11 books. Ludy's books and teachings are used in Christian training curriculums by organizations such as CareNet, Youth With A Mission, and Compassion International.

In 2009, Ludy became President of Ellerslie Mission Society.

Eric and Leslie have six children. Four of the Ludy's six children are adopted, and this strong support of adoption and orphan rescue has been a hallmark of Eric Ludy's ministry and life.

Bibliography 
 His Perfect Faithfulness (1996; with Leslie Ludy). Harvest Books. .
 Romance God’s Way (1997; with Leslie Ludy). Makarios Publishing. .
 When God Writes Your Love Story (1998; with Leslie Ludy). Multnomah Publishers. .
 When Dreams Come True (2000; with Leslie Ludy). Multnomah Publishers. .
 God's Gift to Women (2003). Multnomah Publishers. .
 When God Writes Your Life Story (2004; with; Leslie Ludy). Multnomah Publishers. .
 Teaching True Love to a Sex-at-13 Generation (2005; with Leslie Ludy). Thomas Nelson Publishers. .
 A Perfect Wedding (2006; with Leslie Ludy). Harvest House Publishers. .
 The First 90 Days of Marriage (2006; with Leslie Ludy). Thomas Nelson Publishers. .
 Meet Mr. Smith (2007; with Leslie Ludy). Thomas Nelson Publishers. .
 The Bravehearted Gospel (2007). Harvest House Publishers. .
 Wrestling Prayer (2009; with Leslie Ludy). Harvest House Publishers. .

References

External links 
 
 Ellerslie Mission Society
 Sermons by Eric Ludy on his official website
 Eric and Leslie Ludy at Ellerslie Mission Society
 Interview regarding  The Bravehearted Gospel with the Christian Broadcasting Network

1970 births
Living people
People from Hinsdale, Illinois
American sermon writers
American Christian writers
American Protestant missionaries
20th-century American non-fiction writers
21st-century American non-fiction writers
Writers from Illinois